The esophageal arteries four or five in number, arise from the front of the aorta, and pass obliquely downward to the esophagus, forming a chain of anastomoses along that tube, anastomosing with the esophageal branches of the inferior thyroid arteries above, and with ascending branches from the left inferior phrenic and left gastric arteries below. These arteries supply the middle third of the esophagus.

References

External links
  - "Branches of the ascending aorta, arch of the aorta, and the descending aorta."

Arteries of the thorax